Anđela Mužinić is a Croatian table tennis Paralympic player. She won a silver medal with her partner Helena Dretar Karić in Class 1–3 table tennis during the 2016 Summer Paralympics.

References

Living people
1992 births
Paralympic silver medalists for Croatia
Paralympic bronze medalists for Croatia
Medalists at the 2016 Summer Paralympics
Medalists at the 2020 Summer Paralympics
Table tennis players at the 2016 Summer Paralympics
Table tennis players at the 2020 Summer Paralympics
Paralympic medalists in table tennis
People with paraplegia
21st-century Croatian women
Paralympic table tennis players of Croatia